Lee Duk-hee (born 13 July 1953) is a former professional tennis player from South Korea.

Biography
Lee started in 1973 when she made the second round of the Australian Open, then featured as a doubles player at both the 1973 French Open and Wimbledon Championships. For the rest of the 1970s, she played only representative tennis for South Korea. She was a foundation player in South Korea's Fed Cup team, first featuring in its tournament debut in 1973, with regular appearances from 1976. At the 1974 Asian Games, she partnered with Lee Soon-oh to win a silver medal in the women's doubles. She won two gold medals at the 1978 Asian Games in both the women's singles and doubles.

Relocating to the United States, Lee became the first South Korean of either gender to play professional tennis in 1980. She featured in the singles draw of all four grand slam tournaments in 1980, which was also a first for a Korean. At the 1981 US Open, she lost in the fourth round to Hana Mandlikova after defeating Susan Leo, Susan Mascarin and ninth-seed Virginia Ruzici. In 1982, she defeated Yvonne Vermaak to win the Fort Myers WTA tournament and had a win over Billie Jean King en route to the quarterfinals of the German Open. She reached her career best ranking of 47 in the world in 1983, which was her final year on the professional tour. This remained the highest rank attained by a Korean female player for 20 years until surpassed by Cho Yoon-jeong.

WTA Tour finals

Singles (1-0)

References

External links
 
 
 

1953 births
Living people
South Korean female tennis players
Asian Games medalists in tennis
Asian Games gold medalists for South Korea
Asian Games silver medalists for South Korea
South Korean emigrants to the United States
Sportspeople from North Jeolla Province
Tennis players at the 1974 Asian Games
Tennis players at the 1978 Asian Games
Medalists at the 1974 Asian Games
Medalists at the 1978 Asian Games
20th-century South Korean women